September Films, a UK independent television and film production company, is a division of UK independent production and distribution group DCD Media. It specialises in factual entertainment, documentaries and features, reality programming and entertainment formats.

It was founded in 1992 by feature film director David Green, who devised the groundbreaking Hollywood Women series that launched the company, and was acquired in August 2007 by DCD Media.  Having produced over 2,000 hours of primetime television since its creation, September has offices in London and Los Angeles.

In recent years, September Films has expanded into all non-fiction genres and formats with the appointment of a new generation of creative executives.

Programmes 
 Billy the Exterminator for A&E Network (formerly "The Exterminators")
 Bridezillas for WE tv and Five
 Marriage Boot Camp for WE tv
 Penn & Teller: Fool Us for ITV1
 Richard Hammond's Blast Lab for CBBC
 Alan Whicker's Journey of a Lifetime for BBC2
 Pregnant Man for Discovery Health Channel US and Channel 4
 Boys Joined at the Head for Five and Discovery Health
 Hollywood Lives for ITV
 Generation Xcess for ITV
 Beauty and the Geek for Channel 4
 Weighing In for BBC2
 Messages from 9/11 for A&E
 MallCops Mall of America for TLC Network

Television production companies of the United Kingdom